Kalain is situated in a strategic location of the Cachar district of Assam, India. Kalain has got wonderful landscapes in and around it; the green fields, beautiful tea gardens, amazing weather, and a very delicate population composed of various ethnicities add to its composite structure. There are three railway stations that connect Kalain smoothly to rest of the valley and the state of Assam; one at  Hilara, one at Sukritipur. and one at Bihara

It is the main town in the Katigorah (Vidhan Sabha constituency) in Assam.

Overview 
Kalain, apart from all other relations that it shares with the population dwelling in it from time immemorial, also fosters a sense of an eternal hospitality in the hearts of its people. This is a one-of-a-kind examples to behold in there. There is a society that is inclusive and it is demonstrated through the examples of the multitudes of cultures and cultural diversity there. You may find a lot of NGOs working at grassroot level there; some helping the needy students, some engaged in uplifting the societal horizon in which many economically weak households survive. The roads that pass through Kalain to other places, also pass through the green meadows and the dreamy tea estates surrounding Kalain.

The cultural panorama of the town 
Sylheti is the prominent language of the town. Bengali comes next to it in terms of the use of a mostly spoken language. The other groups of languages that are spoken by several ethnolinguistic groups in and around the town are Assamese, Bishnupriya Manipuri, English, Khasi, Kachari, Kuki, Chakma, Hindi, Meiteilon, Nepali, Baganiya, Saora etc. The main reason behind this linguistic diversity in the culture of the town is because of the migration of people from various parts of the state and the nation related to work and profession that the town sees. The town has a good equilibrium in religious plane, where the Muslims and the Hindus share the major part. However, the most beautiful part of this composition is that in the festivals of both these major religions, the adherents from all spheres participate, celebrate, and complement amongst themselves. The current state of education infrastructure in and around the town can be termed as somewhat in the way of a bloom. There are many educational institutes that are in a rise. Many religious places add beauty to the lifestyle and lifeline of the people out in the town and its vicinity. In one side of the national highway that passes through the heart of the town, you can see a Kalibari and a temple, and in another side of the same national highway you can find a Mosque and an Eidgah adding to the beauty of the town.

References

Cities and towns in Cachar district